Events from the year 2016 in Canada.

Incumbents

Crown 
 Monarch – Elizabeth II

Federal government 
 Governor General – David Johnston 
 Prime Minister – Justin Trudeau
 Chief Justice – Beverley McLachlin (British Columbia)
 Parliament – 42nd

Provincial governments

Lieutenant Governors 
Lieutenant Governor of Alberta – Lois Mitchell
Lieutenant Governor of British Columbia – Judith Guichon
Lieutenant Governor of Manitoba – Janice Filmon
Lieutenant Governor of New Brunswick – Jocelyne Roy-Vienneau
Lieutenant Governor of Newfoundland and Labrador – Frank Fagan
Lieutenant Governor of Nova Scotia – John James Grant
Lieutenant Governor of Ontario – Elizabeth Dowdeswell
Lieutenant Governor of Prince Edward Island – Frank Lewis
Lieutenant Governor of Quebec – J. Michel Doyon
Lieutenant Governor of Saskatchewan – Vaughn Solomon Schofield

Premiers 
Premier of Alberta – Rachel Notley
Premier of British Columbia – Christy Clark
Premier of Manitoba – Greg Selinger (until May 3), then Brian Pallister
Premier of New Brunswick –  Brian Gallant
Premier of Newfoundland and Labrador – Dwight Ball 
Premier of Nova Scotia – Stephen McNeil
Premier of Ontario – Kathleen Wynne
Premier of Prince Edward Island – Wade MacLauchlan
Premier of Quebec – Philippe Couillard
Premier of Saskatchewan – Brad Wall

Territorial governments

Commissioners 
 Commissioner of Yukon – Doug Phillips
 Commissioner of Northwest Territories – George Tuccaro (until May 10), then vacant (Gerald W. Kisoun [acting])
 Commissioner of Nunavut – Nellie Kusugak

Premiers 
Premier of the Northwest Territories – Bob McLeod
Premier of Nunavut – Peter Taptuna
Premier of Yukon – Darrell Pasloski (until December 3), then Sandy Silver

Events

January

January 10 – The recently opened Nipigon River Bridge near Nipigon, Ontario, is closed to traffic after a mechanical failure, severing the Trans-Canada Highway and forcing a detour into the United States.
January 17 – The government of Justin Trudeau announces the appointment of David MacNaughton as Canadian Ambassador to the United States and Marc-André Blanchard as the Permanent Representative of Canada to the United Nations.
January 22 – Four people are killed and seven others are injured in a shooting spree at a house and high school in La Loche, Saskatchewan.
January 28 – The first case of Zika virus is reported in Canada, contracted by people returning from the affected areas
January 29 – An avalanche kills five and injures eight near McBride, British Columbia.

February
February 17 – The Montreal newspaper La Presse publishes an interview with a man who says that influential film director Claude Jutra began sexually abusing him at the age of six, corroborating more limited allegations of pedophilia against Jutra in Yves Lever's newly published biography of the director. Despite having urged caution upon the initial reports, numerous organizations and governments respond to the interview by announcing plans to remove Jutra's name from various events and geographic sites named in his honour, including Québec Cinéma's Prix Jutra film awards, the Academy of Canadian Cinema and Television's Claude Jutra Award, and numerous streets and public parks in Quebec.

April
April 4 – The 2016 Saskatchewan general election results in a third consecutive majority government for Premier Brad Wall and the Saskatchewan Party.
April 10 – 52% of delegates at the 2016 NDP convention vote in support of a leadership review motion to hold a leadership race within 24 months. Party leader Tom Mulcair announces he will stay on as leader until his replacement is chosen.
April 19 – The 2016 Manitoba general election results in a majority victory for Brian Pallister and the  Progressive Conservative Party, defeating Premier Greg Selinger and the governing New Democratic Party.

May
May 3–4 – Fort McMurray, Alberta, is fully evacuated due to a catastrophic wildfire that destroyed numerous structures.
May 8 – The first 5-pin perfect game in the 52-year history of the Youth Bowling Canada Nationals is bowled in Calgary, Alberta.
May 10 – Canada 2016 census
May 29 – Two people – including an intern from Red River Community College – are severely beaten by two addiction-rehab teenagers in Selkirk, Manitoba.  Both victims survived but the intern may lose eyesight.

June
June 28 – A huge explosion completely destroys a house and damages 24 others in Mississauga, Ontario. At least one person is dead and 13 others are injured, according to Mississauga Fire and Emergency Services. Thousands of residents are forced to evacuate and many spend the night at a local community shelter.

July
July 29 – A caravan of motorcycles are wrecked in a chain reaction crash after attempting to pass an RV that was making a left turn. One of the riders was killed and at least nine were injured. The wreck happened near Edmundston, New Brunswick.

August 

 August 20 – The Tragically Hip’s final concert is held in Kingston, Ontario, and broadcast nationwide.

September
September 9 – 14 dogs die in a Saskatoon, Saskatchewan kennel after a thermostat or HVAC failure heated a boarding room to 37 °C overnight.
September 15 – Mylan Hicks, a member of the Calgary Stampeders, dies after getting shot outside a Calgary nightclub.

October
October 25 – Former nurse and serial killer Elizabeth Wettlaufer is charged with the murders of eight of her patients. She was accused of killing the elderly victims with insulin injections over a period of seven years in Woodstock and London, Ontario

November
November 7 – Yukon general election held, resulting in a Liberal majority government.

Sport
May 29 - London Knights won their Second Memorial Cup by defeating the Rouyn-Noranda Huskies 3 to 2. The Tournament was played ENMAX Centrium in Red Deer, Alberta
June 12 - Halifax, Nova Scotia's Sidney Crosby of the Pittsburgh Penguins is awarded the Conn Smythe Trophy
November 26 - November 26 - Laval Rouge et Or won their Ninth Vanier Cup by defeating the Calgary Dinos 31 to 26 in the 52nd Grey Cup played at Tim Hortons Field in Hamilton
November 27 – Ottawa Redblacks won their First Grey Cup by defeating the Calgary Stampeders 39 to 33 in the  104th Grey Cup played at BMO Field in Toronto. Peterborough, Ontario's Bradley Sinopoli was awarded the game's Most Outstanding Canadian

Deaths in 2016

January
 January 1 – Jim Ross, 89, ice hockey player (New York Rangers) (b. 1926)
 January 2 – 
 Marcel Barbeau, 90, painter and sculptor (b. 1925)
 Leonard Evans, 86, politician (b. 1929)
 January 3 – 
 Bill Plager, 70, ice hockey player (St. Louis Blues) (b. 1945)
 Paul Bley, 83, jazz pianist (b. 1932)
 January 5 – Jean-Paul L'Allier, 77, politician, Mayor of Quebec City (1989–2005) (b. 1938)
 January 9 – John Harvard, 77, politician, Lieutenant Governor of Manitoba (2004–2009) (b. 1938)
 January 10 – 
 George Jonas, 80, Hungarian-b. writer (b. 1935)
 Alexander Hickman, 90, judge and politician (b. 1925)
 The Wolfman, 80, Hungarian-b. professional wrestler (WWWF) (b. 1935)
 January 11 –
 Robert Coates, 87, politician,  MP (1957–1988) (b. 1928)
 Stanley Mann, 87, scriptwriter (The Collector, Conan the Destroyer, Firestarter) (b. 1928)
 January 12 – William Needles, 97, actor (b. 1919)
 January 14 – René Angélil, 73, entertainment manager (Celine Dion) (b. 1942)
 January 15 – 
 Daniel Joseph Bohan, 74, Roman Catholic prelate, Archbishop of Regina (since 2005) (b. 1941)
 Avrom Isaacs, 89, art dealer (b. 1926)
 January 16 – Rudy Migay, 87, ice hockey player (Toronto Maple Leafs) (b. 1928)
 January 17 – Mike Sharpe, 64, professional wrestler (b. 1951)
 January 18 – Pierre DesRuisseaux, 70, poet (b. 1945)
 January 20 – 
 Constance Beresford-Howe, 93, novelist (b. 1922)
 Claude Lefebvre, 86, politician, Mayor of Laval, Quebec (1981–1989) (b. 1929)
 January 21 –
 Garnet Richardson, 82, curler (b. 1933)
 Val Sears, 88, journalist (Toronto Star) (b. 1927)
 Ron Southern, 85, businessman (ATCO) (b. 1930)
 January 23 – Archie Gouldie, 79, professional wrestler (b. 1936)
 January 28 – François Barbeau, 80, costume designer (b. 1935)

February
 February 1 – Francis Buckley, 94, business executive (Buckley's) (b. 1921)
 February 2 – Lukasi Forrest, 19, actor (Uvanga)
 February 3 – Brad Kent, musician (D.O.A., Avengers), complications from pneumonia.
 February 6 – , 73, singer (b. 1942)
 February 9 – Elizabeth Joan Smith, 88, politician, MPP for London South (1985–1990), brain injury from fall (b. 1927)
 February 11 – Ellison Kelly, 80, American-born football player (Hamilton Tiger-Cats) (b. 1935)
 February 15 –
 Constance Glube, 84, judge, Chief Justice of Nova Scotia (1998–2004) (b. 1931)
 Victor Goldbloom, 92, politician (b. 1923)
 Vanity, 57, singer (Vanity 6), actress (The Last Dragon), and evangelist, renal failure (b. 1958)
 February 26 – 
 Andy Bathgate, 83, ice hockey player (New York Rangers) (b. 1932)
 Don Getty, 82, politician, Premier of Alberta 1985–1992 (b. 1933)

March
 March 22 – Rob Ford, 46, politician, Mayor of Toronto 2010–2014 (b. 1969)
 March 23 – Jim Hillyer, 41, politician,  MP (2011–2016) (b. 1974)
 March 29 – Jean Lapierre, 59, politician, MP  (1979–1993; 2004–2007) (b. 1956)

April
 April 16 – Charlie Hodge, 82, ice hockey player

June
 June 10 – Gordie Howe, 88, ice hockey player (Detroit Red Wings) (b. 1928)

July
 July 22 – Ursula Franklin, 94, German-Canadian physicist (b. 1921)

August
 August 16 – Mauril Bélanger, 61, politician, MP (b. 1955).
 August 20 – Allen Rae, 83, basketball referee, FIBA Hall of Fame inductee (b. 1932).

September
 September 3 – Norman Kwong, 86, football player, businessman and politician
 September 16 – John Bentley Mays, 75, journalist

October
 October 1 – Daphne Odjig, 97, Canadian First Nations artist
 October 2 – Hanna Zora, 77, Iraqi-born Iranian-Canadian Chaldean Catholic hierarch, Archbishop of Ahwaz (1974–2011) and Mar Addai of Toronto (2011–2014).
 October 3 – Isobel Finnerty, 86, Canadian politician, senator (1999–2005).
 October 4 – 
 Hso Khan Pha, 78, Burmese-born Canadian geologist and exiled prince of Yawnghwe.
 Jim Parrott, 74, Canadian politician, MLA for Fundy-River Valley (2010–2014).
 Bing Thom, 75, Hong Kong–born Canadian architect, brain aneurysm.
 October 13 – Jim Prentice, 60, politician, Premier of Alberta 2014–2015 (b. 1956).
 October 18 – Fred Roots, 93, polar explorer and environmentalist (b. 1923).
 October 20 – Henry J. M. Barnett, CC, 94, physician, stroke researcher (b. 1922).

November
 November 1 – Dave Broadfoot, 90, comedian (Royal Canadian Air Farce) (b. 1925)
 November 7 – Leonard Cohen, 82, singer, songwriter, poet and novelist (b. 1934)
 November 14 – Janet Wright, 71, stage, television, actor, (Corner Gas) and director (b. 1945)

December
 December 13 – Alan Thicke, 69, actor and songwriter (b. 1947)

See also
 2016 in Canadian television
 List of Canadian films of 2016

References

 
2010s in Canada
Years of the 21st century in Canada